Carr Crest is a rock summit rising to  in the northern extremes of the Churchill Mountains. It was named in honor of Roderick Carr, a member of Shackleton's Expedition of 1914–17.

References
 

Mountains of Oates Land